New Faces of 1937 is a 1937 American musical film directed by Leigh Jason and starring Joe Penner, Milton Berle and Harriet Hilliard. Its plot is similar to The Producers (1968). Intended as the first film of an annual RKO Pictures revue series, poor reception ended plans for future productions.

Plot
A crooked theatrical producer deliberately sets about creating an unsuccessful show after selling more than 100% of it to investors.

Cast
Joe Penner as Seymore Seymore, aspiring actor
Milton Berle as Wallington 'Wally' Wedge
Parkyakarkus as Parky
Harriet Hilliard as Patricia 'Pat' Harrington
William Brady as James 'Jimmy' Thompson
Jerome Cowan as Robert Hunt
Thelma Leeds as Elaine Dorset
Lorraine Krueger as Suzy
Tommy Mack as Judge Hugo Straight, Conductor
Bert Gordon as Count Mischa Moody
Patricia Wilder as Pat, Hunt's Secretary
Richard Lane as Harry Barnes, Broker
Dudley Clements as Plunkett, Stage Manager
William Corson as Assistant Stage Manager
George Rosener as Peter, Stage Doorman
Dewey Robinson as Joe Guzzola
Harry C. Bradley as Count Moody's Secretary

Production
An alternate title for this film, which was in production from late March to mid-May 1937, had been listed as Young People. Singer Rene Stone, who appears in the film, was discovered by Edward Small singing while cleaning dishes in a Manhattan restaurant.

Soundtrack
 "New Faces"
(1937)
Music and Lyrics by Charles Henderson
Played during the opening credits
Sung and danced by showgirls (including The Brian Sisters) and showboys to open the final show
Danced by Ann Miller
Sung by Harriet Hilliard and showgirls
 "The Widow in Lace"
(1937)
Music by Harold Spina
Lyrics by Walter Bullock
Sung by Thelma Leeds and showgirls at rehearsal
Played and danced by unidentified children, probably The Loria Brothers
 "Our Penthouse on Third Avenue"
(1937)
Music by Sammy Fain
Lyrics by Lew Brown
Played on piano by Harriet Hilliard and sung by her and William Brady
 "It Goes to Your Feet"
(1937)
Music by Sammy Fain
Lyrics by Lew Brown
Played and sung by Eddie Rio and Brothers
Danced by Lowe, Hite and Stanley act, with Lorraine Krueger
 "If I Didn't Have You"
(1937)
Music by Sammy Fain
Lyrics by Lew Brown
Sung by Harriet Hilliard and William Brady
 "Love Is Never Out of Season"
(1937)
Music by Sammy Fain
Lyrics by Lew Brown
Sung by William Brady and danced by Harriet Hilliard and male chorus
 "When the Berry Blossoms Bloom"
(1937)
Written by Joe Penner and Hal Raynor
Sung and danced by Joe Penner in the show
 "Peckin'"
(1936)
Music and Lyrics by Ben Pollack and Harry James
Additional lyrics by Eddie Cherkose (1937)
Sung and danced by The Three Chocolateers, The Four Playboys and chorus in the big finale in the show
 "Bridal Chorus (Here Comes the Bride)"
(uncredited)
from "Lohengrin"
Music by Richard Wagner
Swing version in the song "Peckin'"
 "The Wedding March"
(uncredited)
from "A Midsummer Night's Dream, Op.61"
Music by Felix Mendelssohn-Bartholdy
Swing version in the song "Peckin'"

Reception
The film recorded a loss of $258,000. Reviews were mixed.

The film was meant to be the first in a series of musical revues designed to introduce new RKO talent, but this did not eventuate. Film writers Richard B. Jewell and Vernon Harbin wrote that:
Containing not a single memorable musical number or inspired comedy routine, this tedious mish-mash caused the studio embarrassment a-plenty. Theatre owners and audiences displayed such hostility towards the Edward Small production in general, and Penner and Parkyakaras in particular, that RKO cancelled plans to make a New Faces of 1938.

References

External links
 
 
 New Faces of 1937 at The New York Times
 New Faces of 1937 at Answers.com
 New Faces of 1937 at Flixster
 
 "Wanna Buy a Duck?" New Faces of 1937, by Craig Hodgkins

1937 films
1937 musical films
Films with screenplays by Irving Brecher
Films with screenplays by Philip G. Epstein
American black-and-white films
Films produced by Edward Small
American musical films
RKO Pictures films
Films directed by Leigh Jason
1930s English-language films
1930s American films